PS Unmuh Jember (previously known as PSPK Pasuruan) is an Indonesian football club based in Jember, East Java. They currently compete in the Liga 3.

References

External links

Sport in East Java
Football clubs in Indonesia
Football clubs in East Java
Association football clubs established in 2014
2014 establishments in Indonesia